"Ride With Me" is a single by Hey! Say! JUMP, released on December 25, 2013. The song was used as the ending theme song for the 2nd special drama, Kindaichi Shounen no Jikenbo Neo SP2: Gokumon Juku Satsujin Jiken, starring group members, Daiki Arioka and Ryosuke Yamada, which aired in January 2014.

Regular Edition
CD
 "Ride With Me"
 "School Girl"
 "Hands Up"
 "Ride With Me" (Original Karaoke)
 "School Girl" (Original Karaoke)
 "Hands Up" (Original Karaoke)

Limited Edition 1
CD
 "Ride With Me"
 "Ride With Me" (Original Karaoke)
 
DVD
 "Ride With Me" (PV & Making of)

Limited Edition 2
CD
 "Ride With Me"
 "Go To The Future"
 "GIFT"
 "Ride With Me" (Original Karaoke)
 "Go To The Future" (Original Karaoke)
 "GIFT" (Original Karaoke)

References

 

 
Hey! Say! JUMP songs
2013 singles
2013 songs
J Storm singles